The 2006 Proximus Spa 24 Hours was the fourth race for the 2006 FIA GT Championship season.  It took place on 29 and 30 July 2006.  It set a record for the farthest distance run since the event changed to the shorter 7 km track in 1979.

This race saw Porsche debut their new 997-generation GT3-RSR in the hands of Manthey Racing.

Half-point Leaders
In the FIA GT Championship (using the GT1 and GT2 classes), the top 8 teams are awarded half-points for their position both at the six-hour mark and at the midway point of the race.

6 Hour Leaders in GT1

6 Hour Leaders in GT2

12 Hour Leaders in GT1

12 Hour Leaders in GT2

Official results

Class winners in bold.  Cars failing to complete 70% of winner's distance marked as Not Classified (NC).

Statistics
 Pole Position – #5 Phoenix Racing – 2:14.9 
 Distance – 4104.152 km
 Average Speed – 171.00 km/h

External links
 Official Results

S
Spa
Spa 24 Hours